Kranjc may refer to:

People
 Aleš Kranjc (b. 1981), Slovenian ice hockey player
 Mladen Kranjc (1944-1988), Slovenian football player
 Matija Kranjc (b. 1984), Slovenian javelin thrower

Other
 7516 Kranjc, main-belt asteroid